The North Siberian (Sibirskaya severnaya) is a general purpose pig breed from Russia. Developed in Novosibirsk Oblast in Russia, this medium-sized breed was formally recognized in 1942. A cross of the short-eared Siberian pigs with Large White boars, the North Siberian was bred for a dense bristle covering and undercoat to increase hardiness to the harsh climate of northern Siberia. Adult males typically reach 312 kg in size.

The North Siberian is a white breed, and multicoloured specimens rejected during the breeding programme were used in the development of the Siberian Black Pied breed.

See also
 List of pig breeds

References

External links
 Breeding pigs of the North Siberian breed.

Pig breeds originating in Russia
Animal breeds originating in the Soviet Union